This article lists electoral firsts in Germany.

Women

First female chancellor 

 Angela Merkel in 2005

First female defence minister 

 Ursula von der Leyen in 2013

First female health minister 

 Elisabeth Schwarzhaupt in 1961

First black woman MP 

 Awet Tesfaiesus in 2021

First Moroccan woman 

 Sanae Abdi in 2021

LGBT

First gay Member of the Bundestag 

 Herbert Rusche in 1985

First gay Vice-Chancellor 

 Guido Westerwelle in 2009

First lesbian Member of the Bundestag 

 Jutta Oesterle-Schwerin in 1987

First lesbian member of the Federal Cabinet 

 Barbara Hendricks in 2013

First bisexual Member of the Bundestag 

 Ricarda Lang in 2021

First transsexual Member of the Bundestag 

 Nyke Slawik and Tessa Ganserer in 2021

Ethnic minorities

First MPs of African descent

Senegalese 

 Karamba Diaby in 2013
 Charles M. Huber in 2013

First MPs of Asian descent

Iranian 

 Sahra Wagenknecht in 2005

Korean 

 Ye-One Rhie in 2021

First MPs of European descent

Bosnian 
 Adis Ahmetovic and Jasmina Hostert in 2021

References 

Politics of Germany
Lists of firsts
Germany politics-related lists